Palabek Refugee Settlement is a refugee camp located across the border from South Sudan in Lamwo District, Northern Uganda.

Background 
Palabek refugee settlement is one of the newest refugee settlements in Uganda officially set up in April 2016 to reduce congestion in larger refugee camps in the northwestern corner of Uganda. hosting over 50,000 refugees primarily from South Sudan with 85% of arrivals composing of  women and children according to the Nations Development Programme Human Development Report.

Gender and equality 

Games and sports 
Palabek refugee camp has a women's netball team who play with a makeshift netball and hoops which helps them spend their leisure and spare time for an effective and worthwhile exploration. The women have a chance to interact with each other and pose game challenges for mental and social development.

Health

Education 
Palabek refugee settlement has 11 primary schools, secondary and technical schools serving more than 25,000 school-age refugee children and older youth who are given a chance to learn and apply their skills in a later time of their lives. This comes to engage the young generation into the most fruitful and lifelong bit of their educational life.

See also 

 Rhino Camp Refugee Settlement
 Sexual exploitation of refugees in Uganda
 Lord's Resistance Army insurgency (1994–2002)
 Onduparaka FC

References 

Refugee camps in Uganda
Lamwo District
Populated places in Uganda